Rebecca Saxe is a professor of cognitive neuroscience and associate Dean of Science at MIT. She is an associate member of the McGovern Institute for Brain Research and a board member of the Center for Open Science. She is known for her research on the neural basis of social cognition. She received her BA from Oxford University where she studied Psychology and Philosophy, and her PhD from MIT in Cognitive Science. She is the granddaughter of Canadian coroner and politician Morton Shulman.

Scientific contributions
As a graduate student, Saxe demonstrated that a brain region known as the right temporoparietal junction (rTPJ) is specifically activated by ‘theory of mind’ tasks that require understanding the mental states of other people.  She continues to study this brain region, and has recently demonstrated that rTPJ is involved in moral judgments; in a task where subjects hear stories and evaluate the permissibility of the characters’ behavior, disruption of the rTPJ causes subjects to place less weight on the character’s intentions, and greater weight on the actual outcomes of their actions.  Individuals with autism show a similar pattern of responses, suggesting a possible role for rTPJ in the etiology of autism.

In addition to her work on theory of mind, Saxe also studies the plasticity of the cortex and the neural substrates of empathy, group conflict and emotion attribution.

Awards and recognition
Before joining the MIT faculty, Saxe was a junior fellow of Harvard University’s Society of Fellows. In 2008 she was named one of Popular Science Magazine’s “Brilliant 10” scientists under 40, and in 2012 the World Economic Forum named her a Young Global Leader.  Her 2009 TED talk has been viewed more than 3.3 million times. Saxe was awarded the Troland Research Award by the National Academy of Sciences in 2014.

References

External links 
Saxe Lab
Rebecca Saxe MIT faculty page
Search PBS.org for Rebecca Saxe
"How we read each other's minds" - talk at TEDGlobal 2009
MIT press release for Young Global Leader award

Further reading

Science Daily article about Saxe's research

Living people
Canadian cognitive neuroscientists
Canadian women academics
Canadian women neuroscientists
Harvard Fellows
Jewish Canadian scientists
Massachusetts Institute of Technology School of Science faculty
Massachusetts Institute of Technology School of Science alumni
Year of birth missing (living people)
21st-century Canadian women scientists